Darmin Nasution (born December 21, 1948) is an Indonesian economist and the current Indonesian Coordinating Minister for Economic Affairs. He was previously Governor of Bank of Indonesia, serving the role from 2010 to 2013 during Susilo Bambang Yudhoyono's administration.

Before taking up various positions within the Indonesian government, Nasution was a faculty member at the University of Indonesia School of Economics, where he was Deputy Chair of the Lembaga Penyelidikan Ekonomi dan Masyarakat (LPEM, or Institute for Economic and Social Research) from 1987, and Head of the LPEM from 1989.

Early life and education 
Nasution was born on December 21, 1948 in Pasar Maga, North Sumatra to a Batak family. He graduated with Bachelor's degree in Economics from the University of Indonesia, in 1976, and received his Master's and Doctorate degrees in the same major from the University of Paris, France in 1986.

Ministry of Finance 
Nasution served as Director General of for Financial Institutions in the Indonesian Ministry of Finance from 2000-2005.  He was subsequently appointed chairman of Indonesia's Capital Market and Financial Institution Supervisory Agency in 2006 and was later transferred to the post of Director General of Taxation in the Ministry of Finance.

Bank Indonesia 
In July 2009 Nasution was appointed Senior Deputy Governor of Bank Indonesia. He was sworn into office on 27 July 2009. Nasution immediately became acting governor of Bank Indonesia because the previous governor, Boediono, had resigned several months earlier in May to run for election as Vice President of Indonesia as team mate of President Susilo Bambang Yudhoyono.

Nasution was subsequently appointed as Governor of Bank Indonesia on September 1, 2010, after parliamentary hearings to consider his nomination as governor. He was succeeded as governor when Agus Martowardojo was appointed in May 2013.

Coordinating Economics Minister 
On August 12, 2015, in a cabinet reshuffle by President Joko Widodo, Nasution was appointed as the Coordinating Minister of Economics, replacing Sofyan Djalil in the post.

References

1948 births
Living people
Indonesian Muslims
Governors of Bank Indonesia
Indonesian businesspeople
Indonesian economists
Mandailing people
People of Batak descent
People from Mandailing Natal Regency
Working Cabinet (Joko Widodo)